Cerotoma trifurcata (also known as the bean leaf beetle) is a species of beetle in the Chrysomelidae family that can be found in the Eastern and West United States.

Description

Morphs can occur with red or yellow elytra and four black spots as well as a non-spotted morph. The head is always black.

Habitat and ecology
The beetle feeds mostly on vegetables that are in the cotyledon-stage, such as cucumbers, cucurbits, pumpkin, and squash. It also can be a pest of legumes such as soybean. In early spring, adult beetles emerge to feed on legumes, such as alfalfa, before crops such as soybeans and green beans are available.

Multiple generations occur per year depending on growing season length with one generation in northern climates, such as Ontario, one to two generations in the Upper Midwest US, and three generations in the southeastern US.

Bean leaf beetle mostly overwinters in woodlot leaf litter, but can also be found in crop fields under soybean debris. Significant mortality can occur below

Feeding
Larvae feed in the soil on plant roots, while adults consume vegetative tissue on host plants. Bean leaf beetle can also transmit bean pod mottle virus to beans through feeding. Feeding can significantly affect crop yield in some cases, although such damage is highly dependent on beetle densities in a field. Insecticides, such as pyrethroids, and delayed planting dates have been used to manage bean leaf beetle populations, but conditions when such measures are effective vary. Insecticidal seed treatments alone do not increase yield in areas prone to bean leaf beetle feeding or virus transmission.

References

Galerucinae
Beetles described in 1771
Insects of the United States
Taxa named by Johann Reinhold Forster